Bacillus is a stick insect genus, common in Europe and North Africa.

Species
The Phasmida Species File lists:
 Bacillus atticus - Brunner von Wattenwyl, 1882
 Bacillus grandii - Nascetti & Bullini, 1982
 Bacillus inermis - (Thunberg, 1815)
 Bacillus lynceorum - Bullini, Nascetti & Bianchi Bullini, 1984
 Bacillus rossius - Rossi, 1788 - type species
 Bacillus whitei - Nascetti & Bullini, 1981

Bacillus atticus atticus is an endemic species found in Greece and Bacillus rossius is found in Europe.

See also 
 List of Phasmatodea of Australia: Bacillus peristhenellus is a synonym of Hyrtacus caurus (Tepper, 1905).

References

External links 

 

Phasmatodea genera
Taxa named by Jean Guillaume Audinet-Serville
Taxa named by Amédée Louis Michel le Peletier